Holy Roar is the twelfth studio album by Chris Tomlin. It was released on October 26, 2018, along with a book titled Holy Roar: 7 Words That Will Change the Way You Worship, co-written with his minister Darren Whitehead, and a Spotify-exclusive "Holy Roar Podcast". Tomlin announced a short Christmas tour and a 2019 Holy Roar Tour to promote the album. Ed Cash and Bryan Fowler handled the production of the album.

Background 
Tomlin has said that parts of the album is a response to current events. In regards to the title Holy Roar, Tomlin states that "people let a massive roar out for different things, but when you put ‘holy’ in front of it, it changes everything. It's this set apart roar." He adds that Holy Roar gives the connotation of "every tribe, every language, every tongue" giving "worship to God". Tomlin states that the lead single "Resurrection Power" reminds the listener "of the foundation of our faith, which is that you've been made alive".

Holy Roar: 7 Words That Will Change the Way You Worship 
Tomlin and Whitehead started to write the book after Tomlin liked one of Whitehead's sermons. The book takes some aspects of Whitehead's sermon and gives a new way of looking at worship. The book has drawn criticism from critics that have said that the whole book is based on an urban myth, and is not factual.

Critical reception 

Holy Roar has received average reception from critics. James Larsen of Jesusfreakhideout says the album sounds overall too "similar and generic" although there are some good songs. Hallels' reviewer Timothy Yap stated that the album seems too "manufactured" and "safe" for a "stellar songwriter like Tomlin".

Track listing

Accolades

Charts

References 

2018 albums
Chris Tomlin albums